Anton Donhauser  (September 19, 1913 - February 10, 1987) was a German politician, representative of the Christian Social Union of Bavaria.

See also
List of Bavarian Christian Social Union politicians

References

Members of the Bundestag for Bavaria
Members of the Bundestag 1953–1957
Members of the Bundestag 1949–1953
1953 births
1987 deaths
Members of the Bundestag for the Christian Social Union in Bavaria